Vladislav Bogićević (born 7 November 1950) is a Serbian retired football (soccer) player.

He is a member of the American National Soccer Hall of Fame.

Club career
Bogićević's playing career included 13 seasons with Red Star Belgrade where he was part of five Yugoslav league winning teams. Throughout his time at Red Star he was known by nickname Bleki.

With his confident play for Red Star, Bogićević garnered interest from several European clubs. However, strict sporting rules of communist Yugoslavia stating that no player could move abroad until the start of calendar year in which he turns 28 prevented the transfer from taking place.

New York Cosmos
In January 1978, technically still at the age of 27, Bogićević joined the New York Cosmos of the North American Soccer League. In time, the media would nickname him Bogie. In 203 regular season games, Bogićević scored 31 goals and 147 assists. He appeared in additional 33 playoff games scoring 8 goals and 19 assists.

"Bogie" was named to either the first or second team all-star team in each of his seven NASL seasons (second team in 1978 and 1979, and first team in 1980, 1981, 1982, 1983, and 1984). He was also on three NASL championship winning teams. He was the league assist leader in 1981, 1982, and 1983.

Bogićević was inducted into the U.S. National Soccer Hall of Fame on 14 October 2002.

International
On the international scene, Bogićević appeared in 23 matches for Yugoslavia, scoring a total of two goals, and representing his country at the 1974 FIFA World Cup.

Euro 72 qualifying
Bogićević made his debut on 9 May 1971 versus East Germany. Looking to protect the 0–2 away lead, head coach Vujadin Boškov brought the 21-year-old as a second-half substitute for Brane Oblak. By the end Yugoslavia conceded a goal, but still managed to hold on for important 1–2 away win in front of 94,876 fans in Leipzig.

Short substitute appearance was Bogićević's only action of the entire qualifying cycle. Yugoslavia finished the qualifying group on top, but lost to Soviet Union in the second qualifying round and thus failed to clinch a spot for the final tournament in Belgium.

It would be year and a half before Bogićević got another chance with the national team. On 20 September 1972, in preparation for the start of 1974 World Cup qualifying, Yugoslavia played a friendly with Italy in Turin. Head coach Boskov who stayed on for another qualifying cycle despite a failure in the previous one gave Bogićević another substitute appearance – this time for Petar Krivokuća.

1974 World Cup qualifying
Bogićević didn't feature in the first two matches of Yugoslavia's qualifying campaign during the fall of 1972.

However, he finally got a starting opportunity on 9 May 1973 in a friendly versus West Germany in Munich as well as four days later versus Poland in Warsaw. Couple of months later he was a starter in another friendly versus Hungary in Belgrade.

As the qualifying resumed on 21 October 1973 with a clash versus Spain in Zagreb, Bogićević reached another milestone – his first competitive start in the national team. It was a sign of Boškov's new-found trust in Bogićević that the coach chose such a big occasion for the youngster's competitive starting debut. Yugoslavia drew 0–0 with the group favourites and the disappointing draw spelled the end of Boškov's time with the national team as he got replaced by a cumbersome 5-man coaching commission consisting of Miljan Miljanić, Milan Ribar, Sulejman Rebac, Tomislav Ivić, and Milovan Ćirić. In the remaining qualifier, Yugoslavia was thus looking at the prospect of having to win away in Greece by a two-goal margin to retain any hopes of qualifying. Bogićević didn't get a single minute in the nerve-wracking match that Yugoslavia won 2-4 thus getting its two-goal margin through a goal by Stanislav Karasi deep into injury time.

Due to finishing the group stage level on points and goal difference, Yugoslavia and Spain were ordered to contest a single-match playoff at a neutral venue with the winner going to the final tournament. Bogicevic played the full ninety in the epic showdown in Frankfurt that was decided by Josip Katalinski's scrambled goal.

Post-playing
Since retirement from football, Bogicevic tried his hand at many different things. He was hired by CONCACAF to promote soccer throughout the United States. He later opened an Italian restaurant and entered real estate business for a while. He also developed a soccer academy in Clifton, New Jersey, that bears his name.

Coaching
In 1994, Bogićević began to take an interest in coaching and has since then had various low-key head coaching stints.

In July 1995, he took over the coaching reins of, now defunct, A-League's New York Centaurs after coach Len Roitman stepped down in the middle of the season. The team finished last in their division.

After taking part in national team scouting sessions during World Cup 1998, he signed a two-year contract with Yugoslav FA in August 2000. When Ilija Petković took the head coaching role for the first time, Bogićević became his assistant. Petković resigned in early 2001, but Bogićević stayed on.

In December 2001 when Yugoslav/Serbo-Montenegrin FA was looking for a single national team coach to replace the 3-man coaching commission, Bogićević expressed strong interest in the position and was interviewed. Then YFA president Dragan Stojković publicly said Bogićević had a disadvantage compared to the other candidates due to his limited head coaching experience and a lack of bench results. However, just several days later, Dejan Savićević, was given the job despite having no prior coaching experience. When his contract with the FA expired in the summer of 2002, Bogićević, who by this time was in a role of observer, did not wish to renew it and left the national team.

One of his most recent coaching stints was with Portuguese First division side Belenenses during the 2003/2004 season. He resigned at the end of the season.

In 2010, Bogićević coached SC White Eagles from Paterson, New Jersey, a team that competes in the North Jersey Soccer League. In 2012, he joined Nyack College (NCAA Division II) Women's soccer staff as an assistant/technical advisor of Head Coach Samuel Oduro.

Career statistics

International goals

See also
List of NK Maribor players

References

External links
 NASL career stats
 Bogicevic's page at the US National Soccer Hall of Fame
 Prvi Srbin u Kući slavnih!, Glas javnosti, 28 June 2002 
 

1950 births
Living people
Footballers from Belgrade
NK Maribor players
North American Soccer League (1968–1984) indoor players
North American Soccer League (1968–1984) players
New York Cosmos players
National Soccer Hall of Fame members
Serbian footballers
Yugoslav First League players
Red Star Belgrade footballers
Yugoslav expatriate sportspeople in the United States
Expatriate soccer players in the United States
Serbia and Montenegro football managers
Serbia and Montenegro expatriate football managers
1974 FIFA World Cup players
Yugoslav footballers
Yugoslav expatriate footballers
Yugoslavia international footballers
Expatriate football managers in Portugal
Association football midfielders
Serbian expatriate sportspeople in Portugal